is one of seven wards of Hamamatsu, Shizuoka, Japan, located in the east-central part of the city. It is the second smallest of the seven wards of Hamamatsu in terms of area, after Naka-ku. It is bordered by Hamakita-ku, Kita-ku, Minami-ku, and Naka-ku.

Higashi-ku was created on April 1, 2007 when Hamamatsu became a city designated by government ordinance (a "designated city"). 

Higashi-ku is served by Tenryūgawa Station on the Tōkaidō Main Line, and by Jidōsha-Gakkō-Mae Station, Saginomiya Station, Sekishi Station and Enshū-Nishigasaki Station on the Enshū Railway Line.

Education

The Hamamatsu campus of Escola Alegria de Saber, a network of Brazilian international schools, is in Higashi-ku.

References

Wards of Hamamatsu